Joseph Thomas Fitzpatrick (June 1, 1929 – July 12, 2006) was an American politician.

Early life 
Fitzpatrick was born in Norfolk, Virginia, in the neighborhood of Ocean View. Fitzpatrick was a high school basketball coach and was involved with the banking business.

Political career 
He was a member of the Democratic Party and became chair of the Democratic Party of Virginia. He was involved with the 1960 presidential campaign of John F. Kennedy and the 1968 presidential campaign of Robert F. Kennedy.

Fitzpatrick served in the Virginia Senate from 1976 to 1981 and served as city treasurer of Norfolk, Virginia from 1981 to 2001. From 1992 to 2000, he served as vice president of the St. Mary's Cemetery board.

Fitzpatrick died in Norfolk, Virginia. He was survived by his three daughters and six grandchildren.

References

1929 births
2006 deaths
Politicians from Norfolk, Virginia
Democratic Party of Virginia chairs
Democratic Party Virginia state senators
20th-century American politicians
City and town treasurers in the United States